Church of the Good Shepherd, Chapel of the Good Shepherd, or variations thereof, may refer to:

In Australia
 Church of the Good Shepherd, Curtin, Australian Capital Territory
 Church of the Good Shepherd, Bellevue, Western Australia
 Church of the Good Shepherd, Hadspen, Tasmania

In Asia
 Church of the Good Shepherd (Taipei)

In New Zealand
Church of the Good Shepherd, Lake Tekapo in South Canterbury
Church of the Good Shepherd, Christchurch in Phillipstown
Church of the Good Shepherd at Bridge Street, Ongaonga (Heritage New Zealand listing 2751. NZ Historic Place Category 2)

In the United Kingdom
Church of the Good Shepherd, Arbury, Cambridge
Church of the Good Shepherd, Aylesbury, Buckinghamshire
Church of the Good Shepherd, Brighton
Church of the Good Shepherd, Collier Row, Greater London
Church of The Good Shepherd, Lake, Isle of Wight
Church of the Good Shepherd, Tatham, on Tatham Fell, Lancashire
Church of the Good Shepherd, Lullington, Sussex
Church of the Good Shepherd, Nottingham
Church of the Good Shepherd, Poole, Dorset
Church of the Good Shepherd, Rugeley, Staffordshire
Church of the Good Shepherd, West Derby, Liverpool
The Good Shepherd Chapel in the Parish Church of St Mary the Virgin, Gillingham, Dorset
Chapel of the Good Shepherd, Carlett Park, in Eastham, Merseyside
The Church of the Good Shepherd, Kirk Sandall and Edenthorpe, South Yorkshire

In the United States

California
Church of the Good Shepherd-Episcopal (Berkeley, California), listed on the NRHP in California
Church of the Good Shepherd (Beverly Hills, California)
Church of the Good Shepherd (Templeton, California)

Connecticut
Church of the Good Shepherd and Parish House, Hartford, Connecticut, listed on the NRHP in Connecticut

Florida
 Church of the Good Shepherd (Maitland, Florida), listed on the NRHP in Orange County, Florida

Georgia
 Church of the Good Shepherd (Thomasville, Georgia), listed on the NRHP in Georgia

Indiana
Church of the Good Shepherd (Bloomington, Indiana)

Louisiana
 Church of the Good Shepherd (Lake Charles, Louisiana), also known as Episcopal Church of the Good Shepherd, listed on the NRHP in Louisiana

Minnesota
Church of the Good Shepherd-Episcopal (Blue Earth, Minnesota), listed on the NRHP in Minnesota
 Church of the Good Shepherd (Coleraine, Minnesota), listed on the NRHP in Minnesota

New York
 Church of the Good Shepherd (Binghamton, New York)
 Church of the Good Shepherd (Cullen, New York), listed on the NRHP in New York
 Church of the Good Shepherd (Syracuse, New York), listed on the NRHP in New York
 Chapel of the Good Shepherd (Chautauqua, New York)
 Church of the Good Shepherd (Raquette Lake, New York)
 Church of the Good Shepherd (Rhinebeck, New York)

Manhattan
 Church of the Good Shepherd (New York City), 4967 Broadway, Inwood, Manhattan
 Church of the Good Shepherd (Episcopal), 240 E 31st Street, in Midtown Manhattan
 West Presbyterian Church (New York City) (Good Shepherd – Faith Presbyterian Church), Lincoln Square, Manhattan
 Chapel of the Good Shepherd, 440 West 21st Street, Chelsea, Manhattan, the chapel for the General Theological Seminary of the Episcopal Church.
 Chapel of the Good Shepherd (Roosevelt Island), on Roosevelt Island, Manhattan, listed on the NRHP in New York

North Carolina
 Church of the Good Shepherd (Cashiers, North Carolina), listed on the NRHP in North Carolina
 Church of the Good Shepherd (Raleigh, North Carolina)
 All Saints Chapel, Raleigh, North Carolina, listed on the NRHP in North Carolina as the Free Church of the Good Shepherd
 Chapel of the Good Shepherd (Ridgeway, North Carolina), listed on the NRHP in North Carolina

South Carolina
 Church of the Good Shepherd (Columbia, South Carolina)

South Dakota
 Church of the Good Shepherd (Sioux Falls, South Dakota)

Pennsylvania
 Church of the Good Shepherd (Hazelwood, Pennsylvania)
 Church of the Good Shepherd (Rosemont, Pennsylvania)

Utah
Episcopal Church of the Good Shepherd (Ogden, Utah), listed on the NRHP in Utah

West Virginia
Good Shepherd Church (Coalburg, West Virginia), listed on the NRHP in West Virginia

See also
Episcopal Church of the Good Shepherd (disambiguation)